Green Party leadership elections took place in the following countries during 2016:

2016 Green Party (Czech Republic) leadership election
2016 Green Party of England and Wales leadership election

See also
2016 Green Party presidential primaries